Tea Party is a play written by Harold Pinter, which Pinter adapted from his own 1963 short story of the same title.  As a screenplay, it was commissioned by the European Broadcasting Union, directed by Charles Jarrott, and first transmitted on BBC Television in the programme The Largest Theatre in the World on 25 March 1965 (Complete Works: Three 100). It was first produced on stage in October 1968 as part of a double bill with Pinter's play The Basement.

Synopsis
Tea Party "revolves around a family engaged in a business of sanitary engineering."  According to an account published in the New Yorker, the play concerns "a middle-aged self-made business man named Sisson" (whom Pinter later renamed Disson), who engages a young secretary, marries a beautiful young second wife, and takes his new brother-in-law into his business–all in the same day"; 
 Mysteries abound. What is going on between the wife and her brother? Are they indeed brother and sister? Sisson has his doubts about that … . Why does Sisson feel that there must be something wrong with his eyes, although he knows that he can see clearly and his eye doctor has assured him that his vision is perfect? He forces his secretary to tie a chiffon scarf over his eyes, and then he is able to make a pass at her, in response to one of her many come-ons. Ordinary events assume a sinister tinge. Sisson's two sons, giving him the deadpan treatment that little boys have been inflicting on their elders from time immemorial, seem as eerie as characters out of a ghost story. Always the questions remain. Is there a conspiracy against Sisson.

Setting
"A modern office in London".

Original cast of BBC TV production
As listed in the published texts, the original cast of the BBC TV production transmitted on 25 March 1965 was:

Stage production

Tea Party was produced as part of a double bill with The Basement at the Eastside Playhouse in New York, directed by James Hammerstein, in October 1968, with the following cast:

Scenery was by Ed Wittstein, lighting by Neil Peter Jampolis, and costumes by Deidre Cartier.

Tea Party opened at the Duchess Theatre on 17 September 1970, also directed by James Hammerstein and produced by Eddie Kulukundis for Knightsbridge Theatrical Productions Ltd, with the following cast" (Complete Works: Three 101):

Notes

Works cited
"Harold Pinter (1930–2008)".  Doollee.com: The Playwrights Database, (last updated) 23 Feb. 2009. Web.  23 Feb. 2009.
Pinter, Harold. Complete Works: Three.  New York: Grove Press, 1978. .  [Contents: The Homecoming, Tea Party, The Basement, Landscape, Silence, Revue Sketches: "Night", "That's Your Trouble", "That's All", "Applicant", "Interview", "Dialogue for Three", "With the Memoir, 'Mac', and the short story, 'Tea Party' ".]
–––.  The Lover, Tea Party, The Basement: Two Plays and a Film Script.  New York: Grove Press, 1967.  .
–––.  Plays Three. Expanded edn., Contemporary Classics series.  London: Faber and Faber, 1997.  .  [Contents: The Homecoming, Tea Party, The Basement, Landscape, Silence, "Night", "That's Your Trouble", "That's All", "Applicant", "Interview", "Dialogue for Three", "Tea Party" (short story), Old Times, No Man's Land.]
–––.  Tea Party and The Basement: Two Plays by Harold Pinter. Acting edn., first publ. 1969. New York: Dramatists Play Service, Inc., 1998.  .
–––.  Various Voices: Prose, Poetry, Politics: 1948–2005.  London: Faber and Faber, 2005.  .

External links

Harold Pinter's reading of his short story "Tea Party" (and selected poems and other stories) – At the 92nd Street Y in New York City on 12 November 1964, hyperlinked in "92Y Podcast: Remembering Harold Pinter, British Playwright", 25 December 2008 (MP3; 65:41).
Tea Party – In HaroldPinter.org: Official Website of the International Playwright Harold Pinter ("Plays"). 
   

Plays by Harold Pinter
1965 plays
Methuen Publishing books